Vejvodová is a female form of Czech surname Vejvoda. Notable people with the surname include:

Hana Vejvodová (1963–1994), Czech pianist and composer
Zuzana Vejvodová (born 1980), Czech actor

Czech-language surnames